Apotoforma kakamegae is a species of moth of the family Tortricidae that is endemic to Kenya.

The ground colour of the forewings is whitish cream sprinkled and dotted brown. The markings are brown. The hindwings are brown cream.

Etymology
The species name refers to the type locality.

References

External links

Moths described in 2012
Tortricini
Endemic moths of Kenya
Moths of Africa
Taxa named by Józef Razowski